, abbreviated as  or MCHS or MCH, is a public high school located in Ido-machi, Matsuyama, Ehime, Shikoku, Japan established in 1986 and opened in 1987 as the newest prefectural academic high school in Ehime Prefecture.

Ehime Prefectural Matsuyama Central Senior High School has produced a large number of alumni, and up to March 2018 (1st to 29th generation students) graduates are 11,403. The school has a capacity of 360 students per grade, but in April 2018, the shortage of students occurred and 350 new students.

Overview 
Moreover, it enters the area of Tobe-chō, Masaki-chō, and Iyo-shi when crossing the Shigenobu River which is adjacent to the school.

Ehime Prefectural Matsuyama Central Senior High School is the newest high school in Ehime and is built by local government according to expectations of the inhabitants. On establishing this school, the Ehime Prefectural Board of Education, agreed to make a school producing competent persons who could make sound contributions to 21st century world. This school has set up the educational principles to promote education which develops each student's personality through contact with teachers and other students.

Academics 

Courses 
Ehime Prefectural Matsuyama Central Senior High School offers courses in "Science and Mathematics", "Health care and Nursing", "Humanities", "English", and a range of electives.

History 
On 26 December 1986, the Ehime Prefectural Matsuyama Central Senior High School was established. (Ehime Prefectural School Establishment Ordinance promulgated)
On 1 April 1987, opened and the first entrance ceremony was held.
In fiscal 2006, the Ehime Prefectural Matsuyama Central Senior High School was designated as Super English Language High School (SELHi) of the Ministry of Education, Culture, Sports, Science and Technology (MEXT). (Only for 3 years)
In 2016, 30th anniversary of the founding.
In fiscal 2017, the Ehime Prefectural Matsuyama Central Senior High School received a commendation for the safety of schools from Ministry of Education, Culture, Sports, Science and Technology (MEXT).

Facilities

Campus buildings 
Main building (Northeast)
Ordinary school building (Halfway between Main building and Special building)
Special building (Southwest)

Other facilities 
Bicycle parking space
Garbage collection place
Machine chamber
Garden
Gymnasium
Martial art gym
Swimming pool (Clubroom)
Clubhouse
Lavatory
Athletic ground
Tennis court
Handball court

Nearby facilities 
Matsuyama Interchange (Matsuyama Expressway)
National Route 33
Matsuyama Soto Kanjo Road
Shikoku Railway Company (JR Shikoku) Ichitsubo Station
Matsuyama Central Park
Ehime Prefectural Budokan
Matsuyama Keirin Track (Setokaze Bank)
Matsuyama Central Park Pool (Aqua Pallet Matsuyama)
Sports field
Sports arena
Tennis court
Matsuyama Central Park Baseball Stadium (Botchan Stadium)
Sub-stadium (Madonna Stadium)
Ehime Prefectural Police Matsuyama South police station
Iyozu Hikonomito Shrine (Tsubaki Shrine)

School events 
First term
Kite festival (May)
English Day (June)
Third term
CENTRAL MARATHON (February)

CENTRAL MARATHON 
Since the school was established, the first and second graders who have been using the embankment of the Shigenobu River are all participating in the marathon race. The boys run the 21.0975 km half marathon and the girls are 10 km away. In the "CENTRAL MARATHON 2018", which was held in February 2018, the student's completion rate was 100% in the first year and 99.4% for the second year students.

School safety 
In fiscal 2017, the high school received a commendation for the safety of schools from Ministry of Education, Culture, Sports, Science and Technology (MEXT).

Emergency response 
In July 2018, Japan was severely damaged by "Heavy rain in July Heisei 30". Therefore, when the Japan Meteorological Agency (JMA) issued the flood warning to Matsuyama-shi or the Student's living area, the Ehime Prefectural Matsuyama Central Senior High School restricts to attending the high school.

Notable teachers and alumni 
 Aono Daisuke (AONO, Daisuke), Ehime FC head coach / Former Japanese football player
 Masutani Kosuke (MASUTANI, Kōsuke), Japanese football player who played in Japan Professional Football League (J.League) for the FC Ryukyu
 Yamamura Michinao (YAMAMURA, Michinao), Japanese former professional baseball Pitcher who played in Nippon Professional Baseball for the Fukuoka SoftBank Hawks / Physical therapist

Access to Ehime Prefectural Matsuyama Central Senior High School

Address 
Ehime Prefectural Matsuyama Central Senior High School1220 Ido-machi, Matsuyama-shi, Ehime-ken, JapanPostalcode : 791–1114Coordinates : 33° 47′ 59.72″ N, 132° 46′ 11.81″ E（〒791–1114 愛媛県 松山市井門町1220番地 愛媛県立松山中央高等学校）

Railways 
Shikoku Railway Company (JR Shikoku) operate limited express train services between Honshu and Shikoku. Yosan Line train (Shiokaze, Ishizuchi, Morning Express Matsuyama, Midnight Express Matsuyama, Uwakai) connects Okayama or Takamatsu to Utazu, Tadotsu, Niihama, Iyo-saijō, Imabari, Matsuyama and Uwajima (All trains stop at Matsuyama station). By the way, Okayama Station is the stop station of the Sanyo Shinkansen of West Japan Railway Company (JR-West).
Ehime Prefectural Matsuyama Central Senior High School is about a 35-minute walk from the JR Shikoku Ichitsubo Station. However, Ichitsubo Station does not correspond to the boarding of the limited express train. Therefore, it is recommended to change from Matsuyama station to a regular train.

Bus transportation 
Iyo Railway Co., Ltd. (Iyotetsu) services are available between Matsuyama Airport and Matsuyama City Station, Matsuyama City Station and other places around Ehime.
Ehime Prefectural Matsuyama Central Senior High School is about a 30-minute walk from the Iyo Railway Co., Ltd. Tobe Line Minamiido Station.
Ehime Prefectural Matsuyama Central Senior High School is about a 20-minute walk from the Iyo Railway Co., Ltd. Kitaiyo Line Minamifurukawa Station.

Expressway 
Matsuyama Expressway connects Shikokuchūō with Matsuyama and Uwajima.
Ehime Prefectural Matsuyama Central Senior High School is near Matsuyama Interchange of Matsuyama Expressway.

Extracurriculars

Students' union 
Student council
Future Homemakers club (Future Homemakers of Japan)

Extracurricular activity

Culture club 

School band
Choir
Art
Literature
Broadcasting
Photography
Birdwatching
Information
Interact
Japanese tea ceremony
Ikebana
Calligraphy
Volunteering
Local history
Biology
Chemistry
Competitive karuta
Go･Shogi
Cooking
Horticulture
Handicraft
Newspaper (Suspended)
Physics (Suspended)
Mathematics (Suspended)

Sports club 

Sport of athletics
Swimming
Basketball
Volleyball
Badminton
Table tennis
Tennis
Handball
Association football
Softball
Judo
Kendo
Mountaineering
Dance
Hockey
Karate
Baseball

Notes

References

External links 

Ehime Prefectural Matsuyama Central Senior High School Official website (Japanese)
Ehime Prefectural Matsuyama Central Senior High School Emergency Alert Information Announcement site (Official) (Japanese)

Ehime Prefecture
Matsuyama, Ehime
Education in Ehime Prefecture
High schools in Ehime Prefecture
Schools in Ehime Prefecture
Educational institutions established in 1987
1987 establishments in Japan
Registered Monuments of Japan